Marakkara  is a grama panchayath in Kuttippuram Block Panchayat, Tirur Taluk, Malappuram district in the state of Kerala, India.

Kadampuzha Temple
The famous Kadampuzha Devi Temple is situated inside the Marakkara panchayath.Kadampuzha Devi Temple is a Hindu temple and pilgrimage center at Kadampuzha in Malappuram district, Kerala, India. The main deity of this temple is Goddess Parvati/Durga in the form of a huntress. There is no idol of Goddess in this temple, and she is worshipped in a pit. The presence of Lord Ganesha is also believed to be with the Goddess, and there are sub-shrines for Lord Sastha and serpent deities. A separate Shiva temple exists near the temple, called 'Madambiyarkavu'. Both these temples are under the control of Malabar Devaswom Board.

Transportation
Marakkara village connects to other parts of India through Kottakkal town.  National highway No.66 passes through Tanur and the northern stretch connects to Goa and Mumbai.  The southern stretch connects to Cochin and Trivandrum.  State Highway No.28 starts from Nilambur and connects to Ooty, Mysore and Bangalore through Highways.12,29 and 181. National Highway No.966 connects to Palakkad and Coimbatore.  The nearest airport is at Kozhikode.  The nearest major railway station is at Tirur.

Demographics
 India census, Marakkara had a population of  40404 with 18999 males and 21405 females.

Administration
Marakkara is a grama Panchayath.Panchayath divided into 20 wards.

Villages

Wards

Election results

Panchayath election 2020 
marakkara panchayath Election 2020

Panchayath election 2015 
Marakkara panchayath Election 2015

Panchayath election 2010 
Marakkara panchayath Election 2015

Marakkara Panchayat

Panchayat president: T P Sajna Teacher [Indian Union Muslim league] , Vice President: Umarali Karekkad [ Indian National Congress]

See also
 Kuttippuram Block Panchayat
Kadampuzha Devi Temple
Valanchery
Edayoor
Kottakkal
Sree Kadampuzha Bhagavathy Temple, Malappuram

References

Villages in Malappuram district
Kottakkal area